This is a list of the 2012 Championship 1 season results. Championship 1 is the third-tier rugby league competition in the United Kingdom. The 2012 season started on 11 March and ends on 30 September with the grand final at the Halliwell Jones Stadium in Warrington.

The 2012 season consists of two stages. The regular season was played over 18 round-robin fixtures, in which each of the fourteen teams involved in the competition played each other once at home and once away. In the Championship, a win was worth three points in the table, a draw worth two points apiece, and a loss by less than 12 points during the game earned one bonus point. Defeats by more than 12 points yielded no points.

For one year only, the top four teams at the end of the regular season, Barrow Raiders, Doncaster, Whitehaven and Workington Town, are promoted to the 2013 RFL Championship, as part of an expanded 14-team division. However, the champions of the division will be decided through the second stage of the season, the play-offs. The top six teams in the table contest to play in the grand final, the winners of which will be crowned champions.

Regular season

Round 1

Round 2

Round 3

Round 4

Round 5

Round 6

Round 7

Round 8

Round 9

Round 10

Round 11

Round 12

Round 13

Round 14

Round 15

Round 16

Round 17

Round 18

Play-offs

The play-offs commence following the conclusion of the regular season and include the top six sides from the league and uses a top 6 play-off system, culminating in the grand final at the Halliwell Jones Stadium in Warrington, home of Super League side Warrington Wolves.

Preliminary Semi-finals

Qualifying and minor semi-final

Major semi-final

Grand final

Play-off ladder

Notes
A. Match originally scheduled for 13 May but postponed due to health and safety reasons 
B. Match rescheduled from 20 May due to Gateshead reseeding pitch 
C. Match rescheduled from 5 August due to waterlogged pitch 
D. Match originally scheduled for 15:00 but kick-off delayed by an hour

References

External links
Official Championship website

Championship 1
2012 in Welsh rugby league
RFL League 1